Sean Day (born January 9, 1998) is a Belgian-born Canadian-American professional ice hockey defenceman who is currently playing for the Syracuse Crunch of the American Hockey League (AHL) while under contract to the Tampa Bay Lightning of the National Hockey League (NHL). Day was selected by the Mississauga Steelheads fourth overall in the 2013 OHL Priority Selection. Day was drafted 81st overall in the third round of the 2016 NHL Entry Draft by the New York Rangers. After several years playing in the minor leagues, Day made his NHL debut in 2021 with the Lightning.

Early life
Day was born in Leuven, Belgium, but grew up in Rochester, Michigan. Keith Day, Sean's father, was an executive with a global chemical company, which has taken him all over the world. His family relocated periodically before he was transferred to the Detroit area. Day holds dual Canadian and American citizenship. Due to his family moving around the world, Day first skated on a mall rink in Singapore.

Playing career
Day's application for Exceptional Player Status was granted by Hockey Canada on March 21, 2013, making him eligible to be drafted a year early in the 2013 OHL Priority Selection. Day was the fourth player to be granted the exemption, allowing him to start his major junior hockey career as a 15-year-old. The other players to have previously received the exemption are John Tavares in 2005, Aaron Ekblad in 2011 and Connor McDavid in 2012. He was drafted fourth overall in the OHL Priority draft.

In the 2016–17 season, on October 19, 2016, Day was acquired by Memorial Cup hosts, the Windsor Spitfires from the Mississauga Steelheads in exchange for draft picks. Gearing towards the playoffs with the Spitfires, on March 8, 2017, Day agreed to a three-year, entry-level contract with the New York Rangers. He would win the Memorial Cup with the Spitfires later that season.

In the 2017–18 season, on January 1, 2018, Day along with Gabriel Vilardi were traded by the Spitfires to the Kingston Frontenacs in exchange for Cody Morgan and six draft picks.

Day began his professional career in 2018 with the Rangers AHL affiliate Hartford Wolf Pack. After a slow start in the first six games he was demoted to the Maine Mariners. He played well enough in 19 games with the Mariners to earn a berth in the ECHL All-Star game, but was promoted back to Hartford before the game.

Day began the following season in the AHL with the Hartford Wolf Pack, but after posting a disappointing 4 points in 16 games, he was demoted to the Maine Mariners, where he would remain until the season was cancelled due to the COVID-19 pandemic.

On May 30, 2020, Day was placed on unconditional waivers by the Rangers for the purposes of contract termination. He cleared waivers the following day and the remaining year of his contract was terminated. As a free agent on July 17, 2020, Day was signed to a one-year, two-way contract with the Tampa Bay Lightning.

He made his NHL debut with the Lightning on December 28, 2021, against the Montreal Canadiens.

Career statistics

Regular season and playoffs

International

Awards and honours

References

External links
 
 

1998 births
Living people
American men's ice hockey defensemen
Belgian ice hockey defencemen
Canadian ice hockey defencemen
Hartford Wolf Pack players
Ice hockey people from Detroit
Ice hockey people from Ontario
Kingston Frontenacs players
Maine Mariners (ECHL) players
Mississauga Steelheads players
New York Rangers draft picks
Sportspeople from Leuven
Syracuse Crunch players
Tampa Bay Lightning players
Windsor Spitfires players